Mi mujer está loca is a 1952 Argentine romantic comedy film directed by Carlos Schlieper and Enrique Cahen Salaberry, and starring Amelia Bence, Alberto Closas, and Amalia Sánchez Ariño.

Cast
Amelia Bence
Alberto Closas
Amalia Sánchez Ariño
Manuel Perales
Julián Bourges
Iván Grondona
Francisco Pablo Donadío
Federico Mansilla
Juan José Porta
Virginia de la Cruz

References

External links
 

1952 films
1950s Spanish-language films
Argentine black-and-white films
Films directed by Carlos Schlieper
Argentine romantic comedy films
1952 romantic comedy films
Films directed by Enrique Cahen Salaberry
1950s Argentine films